HVDC SylWin1 is a high voltage direct current (HVDC) link under construction to transmit offshore wind power to the power grid of the German mainland.    The project differs from most HVDC systems in that one of the two converter stations is built on a platform in the sea.  Voltage-Sourced Converters with DC ratings of 864 MW, ±320 kV are used and the total cable length is 205 km.  The project is similar to the HVDC BorWin2 project but has slightly higher power and voltage ratings.  It is being built by the Siemens/ Prysmian  consortium and was handed over to its owner, TenneT, in April 2015.

See also

High-voltage direct current
Offshore wind power
HVDC BorWin1
HVDC BorWin2
HVDC BorWin3
HVDC DolWin1
HVDC DolWin2
HVDC DolWin3
HVDC HelWin1
HVDC HelWin2

References

External links 
Description of project on TenneT website (in German).
Description of project on TenneT website (in English).
 Factsheet – SylWin1 HVDC Platform 
  SylWin1 HVDC System, CIGRÉ Compendium of all HVDC Projects.

Electric power transmission systems in Germany
Energy infrastructure under construction
HVDC transmission lines
Wind power in Germany
Electrical interconnectors in the North Sea